FabricLive.35 is a DJ mix compilation album by Marcus Intalex, as part of the FabricLive Mix Series.

Track listing
  Calibre ft. Lariman - Over Reaction - Signature
  Calibre - All the Days - Signature
  Lynx ft. Kemo - Global Enemies - Soul:r
  Commix - Faceless (Marcus Intalex Remix) - Shogun
  Jonny L - Come Here - Mr L Records
  Amaning vs Dubwise - Smash V.I.P - Soul:r
  Soulmatic - Self Belief - Good Looking
  Calibre ft. DRS - Hustlin' - Signature
  Calibre - Mr Right On - Signature
  Deadly Habit - Synesthesia (Theory Remix) - Tentative
  Breakage - Clarendon - Digital Soundboy
  Alix Perez & Lynx - Allegiance - Soul:r
  Zero Tolerance ft. Steo - Refusal - Soul:r
  Mist:ical - Time to Fly - Soul:r
  Duo Infernale - Feeling Blue - Soul:r
  Instra:Mental - Pacific Heights - Darkestral
  Bango Collective ft. Kemo & Dennis Jones - Apocalypse - Soul:r
  Mist:ical - Groove Me - Soul:r
  Alix Perez & Sabre - Solitary Native - SGN:LTD

External links
Fabric: FabricLive.35

Fabric (club) albums
2007 compilation albums